The Breast International Group (BIG)-aisbl is a not-for-profit organisation for academic breast cancer research groups from around the world, with its headquarters in Brussels, Belgium.

BIG facilitates breast cancer research at an international level by stimulating cooperation between its members and other academic networks, and collaborating with, but working independently of, the pharmaceutical industry. Such large-scale cooperation is crucial to make significant advances in breast cancer research, reduce the wasteful duplication of effort and resources, enroll numerous patients more quickly, share data and knowledge, and efficiently answer important scientific questions. Faster and robust study results mean faster direct benefits to patients.

History 
In the early 1990s, breast cancer research in Europe was highly fragmented, with academic groups running many similar trials, but not yet interacting in a way to facilitate collaboration. Together, Professors Martine Piccart and the late Aron Goldhirsch, two European opinion leaders, shared a different vision for the future: groups debating the latest research findings, sharing ideas for new clinical trials and working in harmony to conduct these trials together.

They created BIG in 1996 and the group became a legal entity in 1999. Over 20 years later, BIG constitutes the largest global network dedicated solely to breast cancer. It unites 57 academic research groups based in Europe, Canada, Latin America, Asia and Australasia. These entities are tied to several thousand specialised hospitals and research centres worldwide. More than 30 clinical trials and research programmes are run or are under development under the BIG umbrella at any one time, and several of BIG's past studies are already considered landmark and practice-changing. BIG also works closely with the US National Cancer Institute (NCI) and the North American Breast Cancer Groups (NABCG), so that together they act as a strong integrating force in the breast cancer research arena.

BIG clinical trials and research programmes 
Over the years, BIG has developed and successfully run numerous large, phase 3 clinical trials involving thousands of international investigators and institutions. These clinical trials include HERA (HERceptin Adjuvant), MINDACT (Microarray In Node-Negative and 1 to 3 Positive Lymph Node Disease May Avoid Chemotherapy), and ALTTO (Adjuvant Lapatinib and/or Trastuzumab Treatment Optimisation).

Many BIG studies have been practice-changing, for example, putting aromatase inhibitors on the map (BIG 1-98), changing how we treat young women with breast cancer (SOFT), leading to a major breakthrough in treating HER2-positive breast cancer (HERA), or helping physicians evaluate which women with early breast cancer could be spared chemotherapy after surgery (MINDACT).

Most BIG trials incorporate a substantial translational research component and emphasise the collection and banking of biological specimens for the purpose of future research.

While many trials under the BIG umbrella are developed in collaboration with the pharmaceutical industry, BIG also designs and conducts purely academic studies, aiming to answer questions that are essential to patients but with no commercial interest. This is the case for POSITIVE (public name "BIG Time for Baby"), a study that aims to evaluate the safety of interrupting endocrine therapy for young women with hormone-sensitive breast cancer who wish to become pregnant, as well as the pregnancy outcomes.  Other research in this category includes AURORA (the "Metastatic Breast Cancer GPS"), EXPERT ("BIG Radio Tuning") and the International Programme of Breast Cancer in Men.  AURORA, for example, is an ambitious molecular screening programme aimed at understanding the aberrations driving breast cancer metastasis, understanding the evolution of the disease, and understanding why some tumours respond exceptionally well or very poorly to treatment.

These academic studies are made possible only by the generous support of foundations, individual donors, ambassadors, companies and by the fundraising activities run by BIG's philanthropy unit, BIG against breast cancer.

It is important to note that all of BIG's research activities, whether undertaken with commercial or academic partners, adhere to BIG's Principles of Research Conduct. These principles are designed to ensure that, while trials will meet industry requirements from a regulatory standpoint, BIG and its members remain responsible for determining the research agenda, for controlling the clinical study data, and for presenting and publishing research findings (positive and negative) according to academic standards. In this way, BIG preserves its scientific integrity while developing and conducting collaborative research with a variety of partners.

Governance 
The Breast International Group is now chaired by Dr. David Cameron (UK). Dr. Martine Piccart is Immediate Past Chair of the Group and President of BIG against breast cancer.

BIG's Co-Founder and Past Vice-Chair Dr. Aron Goldhirsch passed away on 26 February 2020.

References
 Piccart M, Goldhirsch A, Straehle C, The Breast International Group - a new spirit of collaboration in breast cancer research for the new millennium, European Journal of Cancer, Volume 36, Number 14, September 2000, pp. 1733–1736(4)
 Piccart M, Goldhirsch A, Wood W et al. Keeping faith with trial volunteers. Nature 446:137-138, 2007
 Gnant M, Piccart M, Goldhirsch A et al. Developing an international network for breast cancer research: the BIG experience, Clinical Investigation, (2011) 1(5), 623–628
 Breast International Group (BIG), Hope and Progress - 20 years of breast cancer research, 2019

External links
 Breast International Group (BIG)-aisbl

Breast cancer organizations
International medical and health organizations
Medical and health organisations based in Belgium